Agent(s) of Chaos may refer to:

The New Jedi Order: Agents of Chaos, a two-part Star Wars story arc
 Agent of Chaos (Norman Spinrad novel)
 Agents of Chaos (miniseries), a 2020 documentary by HBO Documentary Films